Technical Park is an Italian amusement ride manufacturer based in Melara, Rovigo, Veneto, northern Italy.

History
Technical Park was born in 1980 taking their first steps in the field of manufacturing of small kiddy rides for the Italian market, and entered the extreme thrill rides market in the 1990s with the introduction of the Reverse Bungee type ride originally called Ejection Seat.

Products
Technical Park offers a wide range of rides including children's rides and Ferris wheels, all of which comply with the International DIN Standard in force and when required Tüv Süd Certification.

Technical Park is best known for manufacturing Ferris wheels and Side Swingers for parks and carnivals.

The Loop Fighter is currently the newest attraction in the Side Swinger category.

Technical Park roller coasters include the Jule Expressen (at Tivoli Gardens), the Python (at Parque Italo Americano) and the Sombrero (at Jacquou Parc).

List of roller coasters

As of 2019, Technical Park has built 5 roller coasters around the world.

References

Amusement ride manufacturers
Manufacturing companies of Italy
Manufacturing companies established in 1980
Companies based in Veneto
Italian companies established in 1980